Renata Muratovna Litvinova (born 12 January 1967) is a Russian actress, film director, and screenwriter.

Biography 
Litvinova was born in Moscow to Volga Tatar father Murat Aminovich Vergazov and a Russian mother, Alisa Mikhailovna Litvinova.
Both her parents were doctors. They divorced when Renata was just one year old.
After school, she entered VGIK in 1984 and graduated in 1989. She attended the same year as fellow screenwriters and directors Roman Kachanov and Arkady Vysotsky. It is here where she worked on her first film as a screenwriter for the film The Much Loved Rita. The Last Meeting with Her (1988).

Career

Screenwriter 
She began her film career as a screenwriter, writing films from 1988 to 1998. None of her earlier projects such as Truck Drivers 2 (1992) achieved any critical or commercial acclaim.
She was discovered by fellow director Kira Muratova in 1994 after Muratova had come across Litvinova's thesis she had written for VGIK. 
Meeting one another at a local festival, Muratova changed her mind and instead wanted Litvinova to star in one of her films.
Litvinova auditioned for the role of the female protagonist Violet but was deemed unsuitable. 
However, Muratova wanted her in the film and allowed her to write a role for herself. Litvinova wrote herself into the film as a nurse.
She continued to write screenplays after her role, which included both Male Revelations (1995) and Principled and Compassionate View (1995). The latter film won the Jury prize at the "Window to Europe" Film festival and was showcased in a number of other festivals around the world such as Japan and Germany. 
She collaborated with Muratova again in 1997 and 1998, writing two screenplays that Muratova directed. 
Litvinova's screenplay Three Stories was turned into a film in 1997, she also played the role of Opha in it. Her story To Own and Belong was adapted into the critically acclaimed crime film Country of the Deaf in 1998. In 2017 Renata made her full debut in theatre with her own piece called "The North Wind" in Moscow Art Theatre. She was the director and screenwriter, as well as she played the key role in "The North Wind".

Actress 
By 2022, Litvinova has gained a status of one of the leading Russian actresses both in TV and theatre. In 2000, she grew popular for her role of Albino Crow in the TV series The Border. She wrote screenplays for films sparingly after this role and starred in all of the films she wrote. Litvinova became acclaimed in the mid-2000s when she was nominated for her roles in Sky. Plane. Girl. (2002), The Tuner (2004) and I’m Not Hurt (2006). In the Moscow Chekhov Art Theatre, Litvinova played Lyubov Ranevskaya in The Cherry Orchard, she also played in Le Shaga written by Marguerite Duras and staged by Marie-Louise Bischofberger, ‘Witness for the Prosecution’ by Agatha Cristie.

Director 
As a director, Litvinova tried herself in many fields. She made her directorial debut in 2000 with the documentary There is No Death For Me. The film focused on the experiences of Litvinova's favorite Soviet Era actresses and gave insight into her views on their stories. As with her screenwriting, she directed sparingly in between her acting roles, directing six films since 2000.  She directed her first feature film in 2004, The Goddess, which she also wrote and starred in. In 2006, she directed her first short film, Rado. Litvinova made her first foray into concert films in 2008 when she directed the film Green Theatre in Zemfira. The film was created using footage from a concert of one of Litvinova's friends, musical artist Zemfira Ramazanova. The film won "music film of the year" from independent music award show "Steppenwolf". The two collaborated again in 2010 to create another Ramazanova concert film directed by Litvinova called Moscow. Crokus/Arrow. Finally, Ramazanova served as the composer on Litvinova's second full-length feature film Rita's Last FairyTale (2012), which deals with "universal themes of love, hate and search for love."

Through the years, Litvinova directed more than 15 video clips for Russian musicians and singers, since 2005 they mostly collaborated with Zemfira. In 2021, she directed a 13-minute promo film for Gucci.

Voice Actress
She lent her voice to the film $8.50 (1999) to be used as a voiceover for the character Xenia who was played by Natalia Adreichenko. Her voice appeared in a number of other films in the 2000s including Frog's Paradise
(2007) and Peregrine (2008).

Fashion and TV 

On TV, Litvinova hosted several author's programs on style, history of fashion and cinematography. Litvinova had also emerged as a designer and fashion icon of her own. A friend and collaborator of Demna Gvasalia; she also worked on Gosha Rubchinskiy’s film, 'The Day of My Death'.

Personal life
Her first marriage was to producer Alexander Antipov, a union that lasted from 1996 to 1997. She then married businessman Leonid Dobrovsky, with whom she had her daughter Ulyana. The couple divorced in 2007. Litvinova came out as bisexual in 2021.

In February 2022, she opposed the Russian invasion of Ukraine, and left Russia. In the meantime, she had decided to reside with her partner, Zemfira, in Paris.

Filmography

Awards and honours

Best Acting Debut at Kinotavr for her role in "Passions" (1994)
"Woman-style" Film Award for her role in "Passions" (1994)
Best Actress at Yekaterinburg film festival for her role in "Three Stories" (1997)
Best Supporting Actress at the International Film Festival "Baltic Pearl" in Riga, Jurmala, for her role "Three Stories" (1997)
Laurel branch for "There is no death for me" (2000)
State Prize of the Russian Federation for her role in "Border. Taiga Affair" (2001)
Best Actress at RKF "Literature and Cinema" in Gatchina for her role in "Heaven. Plane. Woman" (2003)
Honoured Artist of the Russian Federation (2003)
Best Actress for CF "Viva Cinema of Russia" in St. Petersburg for her role in "The Tuner" (2005)
Jury Special Mention at International Film Festival in Wiesbaden goEast for her role in "Goddess: How I Fell in Love" (2005)
Jury Special Mention at International Film Festival in Wiesbaden goEast for her role in "The Tuner" (2005)
Best Actress at Kinotavr for her role in "I'm not hurt" (2006)
National award of public recognition of the achievements of women "Olympia" of the Russian Academy of Business and Entrepreneurship (2007)
Pushkin Medal (2012)
 Best Actress, film About Love, The Golden Unicorn Awards 2016

References

External links

1967 births
Living people
Russian film directors
Russian theatre directors
Actresses from Moscow
Russian film actresses
Russian television actresses
Russian stage actresses
State Prize of the Russian Federation laureates
Honored Artists of the Russian Federation
Recipients of the Medal of Pushkin
Russian screenwriters
Tatar people of Russia
Volga Tatar people
Gerasimov Institute of Cinematography alumni
Russian women film directors
Russian LGBT entertainers
Russian activists against the 2022 Russian invasion of Ukraine